Fairhope High School (FHS) is a public secondary school located in Fairhope, Alabama. Fairhope High School is a part of the Baldwin County Public Schools system. They service grades 9–12.

Clubs and activities
A wide variety of clubs some include: Chess Club, FCCLA, a Christian prayer group known as First Priority, the Girls Service Club, Interact, Honors Society, and Key Club.

Athletics
The Pirates compete in the AHSAA's largest classification, 7A. Fairhope annually fields teams in football, baseball, basketball, soccer, track, volleyball, cross country, golf, tennis, swimming and wrestling.

Football
Each year, the football team plays Foley High School for the Blue-Gold trophy and the Daphne Trojans for the Jubilee Cup. Fairhope's biggest rivals are Foley and the Trojans of Daphne High School. Prior to division of student talent with Daphne High School, Fairhope was a perennial contender in many team sports and earned several state titles.

In 2009, the Pirates finished the regular season 10–0, with wins over both Daphne and Foley. However, Fairhope lost in the second round of the AHSAA 6A State Playoffs, finishing the season 11–1.

Soccer
Fairhope has an established boys' and girls' soccer program with winning traditions. Fairhope's boys' soccer team won the 6A Alabama State Championship in 2009. A new field was built across the street from the school.

Baseball
The Pirates have gone to the AHSAA playoffs eight years in a row and won state championships in 1983 and 1984. The Pirates have also claimed the 6A Area 2 Championship two years running and finished this season 36–8, losing in the playoffs semifinals to the eventual state champions of Auburn High.

Notable alumni
 Regina Benjamin - 18th Surgeon General of the United States
 David King - NFL player
 Leon Lett - NFL Football Cowboys, All-Pro
 Ben Rudolph - Former Defensive tackle/Defensive end of the New York Jets
 Eric Yelding - Former MLB player (Houston Astros, Chicago Cubs)

Feeder schools
Schools that feed into Fairhope High include:
 Fairhope Middle School (7–8), 842 students, Principal Angie Hall
 J. Larry Newton School (K–6), 931 students, Principal Patrice Wolfe.
 Fairhope East Elementary School (K-6), 721 students, Principal Carol Broughten.
 Fairhope West Elementary School (K–6), 1011 students, Principal Julie Pierce.

References

External links
 Fairhope High School Website

Public high schools in Alabama
Schools in Baldwin County, Alabama
Fairhope, Alabama
Educational institutions established in 1925
International Baccalaureate schools in Alabama
1925 establishments in Alabama